

Explorations

Excavations
 Start of excavations at Tell Uqair by Iraqi Directorate General of Antiquities (Seton Lloyd, Taha Baqir and Fuad Safar).
 Start of excavations at Ahichatra.
 Start of excavations in the Vatican Necropolis.
 Excavations at Brahmagiri by M. H. Krishna of the Mysore state Archaeological Department.

Publications
 Gisela M. A. Richter - Handbook of the Etruscan Collection (Metropolitan Museum of Art).

Finds
 September 12 - Lascaux caves. Painted c. 15,000 BC - 13,000 BC. Closed to the public in 1963.
 After ten-year expedition at Tanis, "Silver Pharaoh" tomb uncovered by Pierre Montet. It is the first ever intact tomb found. 
 Ferriby Boat 2 discovered by Ted Wright.
 Balline Hoard in Ireland.

Awards

Miscellaneous

Births
 October 14 - Ruth Tringham, Neolithic household and feminist archaeologist.

Deaths
 February 26 - John Lamplugh Kirk, British archaeologist, collector and museum curator (b. 1869)
 April 25 - Wilhelm Dörpfeld, German archaeologist of Troy (b. 1853)
 June 27 - Harry Burton, English archaeological photographer, known for his photos of the excavation of Tutankhamun's tomb (b. 1879).

See also
 List of years in archaeology
 1939 in archaeology
 1941 in archaeology

References

Archaeology
Archaeology
Archaeology by year